Sigma Pi Sigma, founded at Davidson College on December 11, 1921, is the oldest and only American honor society for physics and astronomy. It is an organization within the Society of Physics Students and the American Institute of Physics and a member of the Association of College Honor Societies.  The society's stated goals are "to honor outstanding scholarship in physics and astronomy; to encourage interest in physics and astronomy among students at all levels; to promote an attitude of service of its members towards their fellow students, colleagues, and the public; to provide a fellowship of persons who have excelled in physics and astronomy." The society has some 90,000 historical members.

History

Academic fraternity
Sigma Pi Sigma was originally founded by a group of ten students and faculty members at Davidson College on December 11, 1921, as an academic fraternity. It was the first in the United States specifically dedicated to the study of physics. Historically, it has been associated with Gamma Sigma Epsilon, another academic fraternity founded in 1919 by Davidson students interested in chemistry.

The first major expansion of Sigma Pi Sigma occurred in 1925 when a second chapter was founded at Duke University. Three years later, in 1928, the society held its first Physics Congress, a national gathering attended by members of the then six extant chapters.

Honor society
In 1934, the Third National Convention of Sigma Pi Sigma elected to transition the organization from an academic fraternity to a society, and in 1945, it became a member of the Association of College Honor Societies, an accrediting organization for honor societies in the U.S.

Honor society within the Society of Physics Students
Later, in 1968, the American Institute of Physics' student sections and Sigma Pi Sigma merged to create the Society of Physics Students.

At present, Sigma Pi Sigma comprises almost 600 constituent chapters.

Membership
Sigma Pi Sigma chapters are restricted to colleges and universities of recognized standing that offer a strong physics program. The chapters receive into membership undergraduate and graduate students, faculty members, and a few others in closely related fields. Students elected to membership must attain high standards of general scholarship and outstanding achievement in physics. Certain high numerical standards for admittance are established by chapter bylaws and the national constitution.

The society's national organization mandates that, at a minimum, undergraduate candidates must rank in the upper one-third of their class in general scholarship. Additionally, undergraduate candidates must complete three semesters of study and three semester physics and/or astronomy courses that can be used to fulfil requirements for a physics and/or astronomy major before they are eligible for membership. Beyond these requirements, local chapters are given discretion in setting their own, more specific requirements. A higher minimum average is often established for physics and astronomy courses.

The society's national organization does not put restrictions on the induction of graduate students and faculty members, saying only that they "may be elected at any time." Additionally, the national organization does not limit membership to physics majors. Any student may join "provided that they meet the standards and have demonstrated an interest in physics and astronomy." 

A chapter can elect to active membership qualified students and faculty members in nearby colleges that do not have a Sigma Pi Sigma chapter. Physicists in industry and government laboratories, as well as secondary school physics teachers, can be elected on the basis of their professional record. Election to Sigma Pi Sigma results in membership for life.

Honorary members
Honorary Member is the highest level of membership in Sigma Pi Sigma. Only distinguished physicists and related scientists who have made valuable contributions to physics at the national level are eligible for this honor. Local chapters may nominate candidates, but election is only by the National Council. Sigma Pi Sigma has elected over a hundred Honorary Members, including Owen Chamberlain, John C. Mather, William D. Phillips, Jocelyn Bell Burnell, Jill Tarter, Carl Wieman, and Robert Ballard.

Organization and governance

Sigma Pi Sigma is governed by the National Council, which consists of members of the Society of Physics Students (SPS). The SPS National Council and its Executive Committee decide the policies of SPS and Sigma Pi Sigma. The National Council is made up of 36 members, elected by chapters from one of 18 geographic zones. Each Zone represents a section of the country and is represented by a faculty Zone "Councilor" and a student "Associate Councilor".  Both Councilors and Associate Councilors participate in zone activities and in the annual policy-making meeting of the Council. The SPS Executive Committee consists of the Presidents of the Society of Physics Students and Sigma Pi Sigma, the SPS National Office Director, the SPS/Sigma Pi Sigma Historian, an at-large member, a student representative, and the CEO of the American Institute of Physics.

The President of Sigma Pi Sigma is elected biennially by Sigma Pi Sigma Chapters from a slate of at least two candidates presented by the National Nominating Committee. The term of the President of Sigma Pi Sigma is two years, beginning thirty days after the election is completed or at the beginning of the next annual meeting of the Council or at the beginning of the next meeting of the Executive Committee, whichever occurs first. The duties of the President of Sigma Pi Sigma include representing Sigma Pi Sigma to the Executive Committee and the Council and providing liaison, together with the Director of the Society of Physics Students, between Sigma Pi Sigma and the Association of College Honor Societies.

Chapters
Sigma Pi Sigma has installed over 575 chapters since its founding.

Presidents
The following served as president of the society since its founding:

References

External links 
 Sigma Pi Sigma National Website
  ACHS Sigma Pi Sigma entry
 Sigma Pi Sigma chapter list at ACHS

Association of College Honor Societies
Honor societies
Student organizations established in 1921
1921 establishments in North Carolina